Amar Ferhatović (born 3 May 1977) is a retired Bosnian football player who played in the position of attacking midfielder.

International career
Ferhatović made three appearances for Bosnia and Herzegovina at the 2001 Merdeka Tournament, two games regarded as official ones.

References

External links

Profile - NFSBIH

1977 births
Living people
Footballers from Sarajevo
Association football midfielders
Bosnia and Herzegovina footballers
Bosnia and Herzegovina international footballers
FK Sarajevo players
Szombathelyi Haladás footballers
GKS Bełchatów players
NK SAŠK Napredak players
Premier League of Bosnia and Herzegovina players
Ekstraklasa players
First League of the Federation of Bosnia and Herzegovina players
Bosnia and Herzegovina expatriate footballers
Expatriate footballers in Italy
Bosnia and Herzegovina expatriate sportspeople in Italy
Expatriate footballers in Hungary
Bosnia and Herzegovina expatriate sportspeople in Hungary
Expatriate footballers in Poland
Bosnia and Herzegovina expatriate sportspeople in Poland